Marfa Ekimova (born 17 January 2005) is a Russian born British rhythmic gymnast. She s the 2022 Commonwealth Games All-Around champion.

Personal life 
Born in Saint Petersburg, Russia, at age two she moved to London, England. She took up gymnastics at age six after having tried different sports, dance and theatre but, even though she stated that when she first tried the sport she hated it, rhythmic gymnastics was her passion. She now trains up to eight hours a day. In her spare time, Marfa is a passionate music lover, especially playing the bassoon and piano, and studies A Level music at Trinity Laban Conservatory as well as completing her NCFE Level 3 Diploma/Extended Diploma in Sport and Physical Activity at the City of Westminster College. Ekimova speaks English and Russian. Her dream is to compete at the 2024 Olympic Games in Paris.

Career 
Ekimova debuted as a senior internationally at 2021 European Championships in Varna, representing Great Britain along Alice Leaper and Gemma Frizelle. She was 17th in the team competition, 33rd with hoop, 51st with ball and 37th with clubs. In October she was selected for the World Championship in Kitakyushu, where she was 44th in the All-Around, 39th with hoop, 53rd with ball, 38th with clubs and 59th with ribbon.

In 2022 she competed at the World Cup in Portimão in May, finishing 30th in the All-Around, 21st with hoop, 43rd with ball, 19th with clubs, 34th with ribbon. In June she took part in the European Championships in Tel Aviv with teammates Louise Christie and Alice Leaper the senior national group and juniors Melissa Toma, Elizaveta Andreeva and Nicole Kalnina . Marfa was 16th in the team competition, 23rd with hoop, 30th with ball, 28th with clubs and 31st in the All-Around. In early August she competed at the Commonwealth Games in Birmingham, winning bronze in the team competition with Alice Leaper and Saffron Severn, she was 4th with hoop and ball, 6th with ribbon and won an historical gold in the All-Around, becoming the first English gymnast to do so. And in September she was chosen as GBR's representative for the World Championships in Sofia, she was 38th with hoop and 35th with ball after day one of qualification, but she had to withdraw from competition.

Achievements 

 First English rhythmic gymnast to win a gold medal in the All-Around at the Commonwealth Games.

Routine music information

References 

2005 births
Living people
British rhythmic gymnasts
Russian emigrants to the United Kingdom
Commonwealth Games medallists in gymnastics
Commonwealth Games gold medallists for England
Commonwealth Games bronze medallists for England
Gymnasts at the 2022 Commonwealth Games
Medallists at the 2022 Commonwealth Games